Persikutim stand for Persatuan Sepakbola Indonesia Kutai Timur (en: Football Association of Indonesia East Kutai). Persikutim East Kutai is an Indonesian football club based in Sangatta, East Kutai Regency, East Kalimantan. They currently compete at Liga 3. Persikutim East Kutai main rivals are PS Mitra Kukar and Persikubar West Kutai.

Honours
 Liga 3 East Kalimantan
 Champions: 2021

References

External links
Liga-Indonesia.co.id
PERSIKUTIM on Facebook

East Kutai Regency
Football clubs in East Kalimantan
Football clubs in Indonesia
Association football clubs established in 1999
1999 establishments in Indonesia